The Rebel is a 76-episode American Western television series starring Nick Adams that ran on the ABC network from 1959 to 1961. The Rebel was one of the few Goodson-Todman Productions outside of their  game-show ventures.

Synopsis
The series portrays the adventures of young Confederate army veteran Johnny Yuma, an aspiring writer, played by Nick Adams. Haunted by his memories of the American Civil War, Yuma, in search of inner peace, roams the American West, specifically the Texas Hill Country and South Plains. He keeps a journal of his adventures and fights injustice where he finds it with a revolver and his dead father's sawed-off, double-barreled shotgun.

Cast

Main
Adams was the star and only regular actor of this series. He was involved in the show's design, inception, and writing, along with the producer, Andrew J. Fenady, who appeared twice in the series, once as United States Army General Philip Sheridan in the episode "Johnny Yuma at Appomattox", with George Macready as General Robert E. Lee. John Carradine appeared in two episodes as Elmer Dodson, the newspaper editor in Johnny Yuma's hometown, fictitious Mason City, Texas, who encourages Yuma to keep a journal of his travels.

John M. Pickard, formerly of the syndicated Boots and Saddles television series, appeared three times on The Rebel, including the role of Sheriff Pruett in "Run, Killer, Run". Hal Stalmaster played Skinny in the 1959 episode "Misfits", including Malcolm Cassell as Billy the Kid and Hampton Fancher as "Bull". The young "Misfits" enlist The Rebel's "help" to rob a bank, and in their minds live thereafter a life of leisure. Leonard Nimoy was cast as Jim Colburn in the 1960 episode "The Hunted", the story of an innocent man on the run from a posse that does not know that Colburn was acquitted by a jury.

Olive Sturgess guest-starred twice on The Rebel, as Jeannie in "The Scavengers" (1959) and as Charity Brunner, a woman in search of her missing miner husband, in "The Pit" (1961). In the second episode, Sturgess's real-life six-month-old nephew, Leonard Sturgess, played the baby required in the script.

Guest stars

Episodes

Season one (1959–60)

Season two (1960–61)

Series highlights

The first episode, "Johnny Yuma", is set in early 1867. It shows Johnny Yuma returning to his hometown nearly two years after the end of the war.  His father, Ned Yuma, the sheriff, had been killed by a gang who took control of the town. Dan Blocker plays the gang leader.  Yuma gets his father's shotgun in this episode.

The third episode,  entitled "Yellow Hair", has Yuma captured by the historical Kiowa chief Satanta, played by native Mexican Rodolfo Acosta, whose fictional adopted white daughter is played by Carol Nugent, Nick Adams' wife.

Several place names mentioned throughout the episodes clearly place the action in post-Civil War Texas, New Mexico, and Arizona. Forts noted in episodes, such as Fort Griffin and Fort Concho, were actual frontier Texas outposts of the late 1860s and are now state historic sites. In a first-season episode, Yuma encounters rag-tag rebel CSA soldiers in the corrupt mining town of La Paz, Arizona. The actual town of La Paz was the seat of Yuma County between 1862 and 1870; it stood in the Confederate Arizona Territory, which existed briefly during the Civil War. Nothing remains of La Paz but crumbling foundations and a historical marker.

Singing the theme song over the titles each week, Johnny Cash also appears as a frustrated would-be rapist playing a banjo with mounting intensity as he excitedly peers through a window at his tied-up prey in the 13th episode, "The Death of Gray".

In "Vicious Circle", Yuma identifies the Confederate unit he served in as the 3rd Texas, but he does not indicate the branch of service.  Other episodes show saddlebags stenciled with CSA and an old uniform jacket with yellow collar and cuffs, indicating his regiment was likely the 3rd Texas Cavalry.

Robert Blake guest stars as an extremely young gunslinger in the episode titled "He's Only a Boy".

The 25th episode, "Fair Game", gained attention at the end of 2015 because it appears to be a principal source for Quentin Tarantino's feature The Hateful Eight, including a female prisoner (Patricia Medina) and a few significant plot twists.

After the show's original run on ABC finished in June 1961, it was picked up by NBC and rerun as a summer replacement series from June to September 1962.

Cancellation

The Rebel was a ratings success for ABC, commanding a 35% share of the Sunday-evening audience in its time slot, and was actually scheduled to be renewed for a third season, as part of a new hour-long series entitled The Rebel and The Yank, which would have again starred Nick Adams as the Rebel, and future The Virginian star James Drury starring as "the Yank", a former Union soldier working as a doctor in the Southern United States. Despite the show's success, ABC decided to pass on the series due to two factors, first, its violence (at a time when the network was trying to withdraw from violent programming), and second, the network's new "counterprogramming" format, in which a different type of show was scheduled against the network competition in that time slot, such as a comedy or variety show against an action-adventure show. Thus, The Rebel was cancelled, The Rebel and The Yank project never came to fruition. The series was replaced by a new variety show, starring Steve Allen. This program was not a success, lasting less than four months.

Theme song
The show's theme song, "The Rebel" alias "The Ballad of Johnny Yuma", was composed by Richard Markowitz, with lyrics by Andrew J. Fenady. Members of the Western Writers of America chose it as one of the Top 100 Western songs of all time. It was recorded by Johnny Cash, but it was not released as a single until April 1961, shortly before the show went off the air. Nick Adams recorded the theme, which was released on Mercury Records (#71607) by March 1960. During syndication, the theme song was replaced by the DeWolfe Music Library instrumental track "Dodge City No. 1" by Jack Trombey.

Popular culture
Two episodes of the sitcom Seinfeld referenced the first line of The Rebel theme song. In the episode "The Heart Attack", Jerry retorts to Kramer that Johnny Yuma is a Rebel.
The Rebel was also a 1966 Allan Sherman song from the album Allan Sherman Live!; and later, in 1994, it was applied to the compilation album My Son, the Greatest.

Merchandise

Board Game
At the time, a board game based on the show was released by Ideal in 1961.

Comic Book
At the time, Dell Comics (or Dell Publishing Co.) issued only four stories that were based on The Rebel in their Four Color Comics anthology series, Issue #1076 and Issue #1138, released in 1960 and Issue #1207 and Issue #1262, released in 1961.

Home Media
On August 18, 2015, Timeless Media Group released The Rebel- The Complete Series on DVD in Region 1.  The 11-disc set contained all 76 episodes of the series as well as bonus features.

References

External links

 
 Pilot for the unsold seriesThe Yank starring James Drury

1950s Western (genre) television series
1960s Western (genre) television series
1959 American television series debuts
1961 American television series endings
Television series set in the 1860s
American Broadcasting Company original programming
Black-and-white American television shows
English-language television shows
Television series by CBS Studios
Television series by Fremantle (company)
Television series by Mark Goodson-Bill Todman Productions
Television shows set in Texas